Babaci is a surname. Notable people with the surname include:

Lahcen Babaci (born 1957), Algerian middle-distance runner
Sayed Ali Babaci (born 1915), Afghan field hockey player